White-winged tit may refer to:

 White-naped tit (Machlolophus nuchalis) of Asia
 White-winged black tit (Melaniparus leucomelas) of Africa